Paolo Pecci (1630–1694) was a Roman Catholic prelate who served as Bishop of Massa Marittima (1679–1694).

Biography
Paolo Pecci was born on 18 Aug 1630 in Siena, Italy and ordained a priest on 3 May 1679.
On 27 Nov 1679, he was appointed during the papacy of Pope Innocent XI as Bishop of Massa Marittima.
On 10 Dec 1679, he was consecrated bishop by Antonio Bichi, Bishop of Osimo, with Giacomo de Angelis, Archbishop Emeritus of Urbino, and Marcantonio Zollio, Bishop of Crema, serving as co-consecrators. 
He served as Bishop of Massa Marittima until his death in Oct 1694.

References

External links and additional sources
 (for Chronology of Bishops) 
 (for Chronology of Bishops) 

17th-century Italian Roman Catholic bishops
Bishops appointed by Pope Innocent XI
1630 births
1694 deaths